Bradysaurus was a large, early and common pareiasaur, the fossils of which are known from the Tapinocephalus Assemblage Zone (Capitanian age) of the South African Karoo. Along with the similarly large dinocephalia, the bradysaurs constituted the herbivorous megafauna of the late Middle Permian Period. In life they were probably slow, clumsy and inoffensive animals, that had evolved a covering of armoured scutes to protect them against their predators, the gorgonopsians.

Description 
 

The skull was large (about 42 to 48 centimeters long), broad and rounded at the front. It was coarsely sculptured and knobby, with the sutures between the bones not clearly visible. The marginal teeth were high-crowned, with only a few cusps, which is a primitive characteristic. The feet were short and broad, the phalangeal count being 2,3,3,3,2 on the fore-foot and 2,3,3,4,3 on the hind. The whole body is protected by dermal scutes, although these are not as thick or heavy as in more advanced forms.

Classification and species
Bradysaurus is the only member of the subfamily Bradysaurinae. It is the most primitive known pareiasaur and can be considered a good ancestral type from which the others developed. Its large dimensions show that, even very early in their evolutionary history, these strange animals had already attained an optimal size. Even later, more advanced forms, like Scutosaurus, were no larger. The advantage of large size was to provide defense against predators and to maintain a stable body temperature (gigantothermy).

Kuhn 1969 lists no fewer than nine species for this genus, but this is certainly an excessive number. Boonstra 1969 distinguishes only four species on the basis of tooth structure, two of which Kuhn places in the genus Embrithosaurus. The genera Brachypareia, Bradysuchus, Koalemasaurus, and Platyoropha are synonyms of Bradysaurus.

B. baini (Seeley, 1892) is from the Tapinocephalus zone, Lower Beaufort Beds, Karoo basin, South Africa. This is the type species for the genus. The quadra-jugal region (cheek-bones) were only moderately developed. The snout was broad and rounded and there were 15 or 16 pairs of overlapping teeth in each jaw. This animal could be considered a generic early pareiasaur. According to Lee, 1997, the available material of B. baini lacks distinguishing autapomorphies or characteristics.

B. seeleyi (Haughton and Boonstra, 1929) is from the Tapinocephalus zone, Lower Beaufort Beds, Karoo basin, South Africa. This is a less common form. Boonstra, 1969, considered this a valid species of Bradysaurus and Lee, 1997, considers this animal a sister group to more advanced pareiasaurs. B. seelyi seems to be closely related to Nochelesaurus and Embrithosaurus. In contrast to the more numerous but similarly sized B. baini, the cheekbones were heavy and greatly enlarged. There were 19 or 20 pairs of strongly overlapping teeth on each jaw.

References

 Boonstra, L. D. 1969, "The Fauna of the Tapinoephalus Zone (Beaufort Beds of the Karoo)," Ann. S. Afr. Mus. 56 (1) 1-73, pp. 29–32 
 Edwin H. Colbert, 1965, The Age of Reptiles,  The World Naturalist, Weidenfeld and Nicolson, London,  pp. 52–3 
 Barry Cox, R.J.G.Savage, Brian Gardiner, Dougal Dixon, 1988 Illustrated Encyclopaedia of Dinosaurs and Prehistoric Animals 
 Carroll Lane Fenton and Mildred Adams Fenton, 1958, The Fossil Book, Doubleday & Co., Garden City, New York,  p. 306 
 Kuhn, O, 1969, Cotylosauria, part 6 of Handbuch der Palaoherpetologie (Encyclopedia of Palaeoherpetology), Gustav Fischer Verlag, Stuttgart & Portland, 
 Lee, MSY (1997), Pareiasaur phylogeny and the origin of turtles. Zool. J. Linnean Soc., 120: 197-280

External links
 Bradysaurs at Palaeos

Pareiasaurs
Permian reptiles of Africa
Fossil taxa described in 1914
Capitanian genus first appearances
Capitanian genus extinctions
Prehistoric reptile genera